Gephyra cynisca is a species of snout moth in the genus Gephyra. It was described by Herbert Druce in 1895, and is known from Mexico, Guatemala, and Panama.

References

Moths described in 1895
Chrysauginae